In superstring theory, each state may be represented in many ways, depending on how the ground state is defined. Each representation is called a picture, and is denoted by a number, such as 0 picture or −1 picture.

The difference between the ground states is according to the action of the superghosts oscillators on them, and the number of the picture (plus 1/2) reflects the highest superghost oscillator which does not annihilate the ground state.

References

String theory